Room temperature may refer to:

Room temperature, the temperature that most humans are accustomed to
Room-temperature superconductor, a theoretical material
Room Temperature (album), a live album by Peter Hammill
Room Temperature (novel), novel by Nicholson Baker